The Kuhn-Popper debate was a philosophical debate about inquiry and the growth of knowledge. It is best known for its inquiry into research methodologies. The debate was sparked by a disagreement about the role of the normal scientist. In The Structure of Scientific Revolutions, Thomas Kuhn proposed a sociological model of normal science and revolutionary science to represent how research progresses under paradigms and paradigm shifts, a model that Karl Popper rejected. Popper instead proposed a prescriptive approach, deeming that science is the procession of bold ideas and questions that aim toward greater truths, where normal science should not be an accepted standard for the scientist. This counter-proposal sparked the Kuhn-Popper debate.

Background

Thomas Kuhn 
Thomas Kuhn (1922-1996) was born into a world of technological and scientific advancement. Working as a historian and philosopher of science at MIT, Kuhn published The Structure of Scientific Revolutions in 1962, proposing a theory for classifying generational knowledge under frameworks known as paradigms. Paradigms being, “an accepted model or pattern,”  when upturned, “what were ducks in the scientist’s world before the revolution are rabbits afterwards.” this is called gestalt psychology.

Karl Popper 
Karl Popper (1902-1994) was born into a world of dogmatism and ideology amidst totalitarianism and WW2. As a Jew at the University of Vienna, Popper had fled to New Zealand taking up professorship at the University of Canterbury. Here, he had begun to write The Poverty of Historicism (1957) and The Open Society and Its Enemies (1945) the day the Nazis stormed Austria. Both works are critical analyses of methodologies within the social sciences. However beyond the social sciences, Popper was also a physicist who lived amidst the second quantum revolution. Such a time proceeded through bold ideas and questions (a time which Kuhn identified as revolutionary science.) 

This background inspired Popper to produce methodological ways of knowing based upon critical rationalism, producing the concept of falsifiability. Because of Kuhn and Poppers different contexts, the two proposed starkly different theories on the growth of knowledge. However, it is recognized that the two shared similar fan bases and still agreed on most areas of contention within the sciences.

Debate

Argument 

Kuhn and Popper proposed different models for how knowledge grows in science. Kuhn believed knowledge was cumulative but oscillated as it was fraught with assumptions from social factors, progressing through paradigms and paradigm shifts, whereas Popper argued Kuhn's model was far too deterministic. Popper instead ascribes the hypothetico-deductive model (which also acts cumulatively) as the foundation for the growth of scientific knowledge, believing:“The history of all human ideas, is a history of irresponsible dreams, of obstinacy, and of error which needs to be corrected, and classified if any greater truth is to be approached.”
Which is why Popper rejected Kuhn's acceptance of normal science.  Poppers model however, was prescriptive, rather then truly reflective of reality. His model was later attacked for being too 'romantic' due to this, whereas Kuhn's was popularly accepted to have realistically portrayed scientific progression from a sociological perspective.

Outcome 
Inquiry was central to the Kuhn-Popper debate, and while the two men were both philosophers of science, one was a historian and the other a scientist. This greatly influenced their perspectives. The debate never reached a true consensus, however it represents two popular perspectives on how to treat the growth of knowledge, promoting:

 Deconstruction and recognition of inherent bias;
 Constant revision and testing;
 Using frameworks as a means to inform methodologies.

Philosophical influences 
Karl Popper's initial perspectives paid tribute to Bertrand Russel and Tarski. However Popper soon diverted from these early influences, rejecting specific linguistic analyses as a means to derive deeper meanings from, favouring less-specific cases instead (finding social systems to be too complex a system to deconstruct from deductive inference.) Often Popper looked for how language was broadly used, and from there, deconstructed anti-rationalist tendencies such as Historicism, and Marxism using falsifiability.  This approach largely removed him from the dominant Neo-Kantian tradition.    

Poppers philosophical doctrine is that of critical rationalism. It is dependent upon a theory for attaining knowledge with rejected causation as a viable path to knowledge due its inability to explain future events. This is inspired by  Hume's problem of Induction,  where Hume says:"...the supposition, that the future resembles the past, is not founded on arguments of any kind,’ but is deriv’d entirely from habit."In The Logic of Scientific Discovery Popper refuted Hume's final sentiment that nothing can be known due to the illusory nature of the  world, and instead proposed a deductive model of science. This model is rationalist, but critical insofar as it actively rejects inductivism.

Reference 

Debates